Carina EJ Van Tittelboom-Van Cauter (born 27 June 1962) is a Belgian politician from the Open Flemish Liberals and Democrats who has been a member of the Senate of Belgium since 2007. She has been the governor of East Flanders since 1 September 2020.

References

See also 

 List of members of the Senate of Belgium, 2019–24

Living people
1962 births
Members of the Belgian Federal Parliament
Members of the Senate (Belgium)
Women members of the Senate (Belgium)
21st-century Belgian women politicians
21st-century Belgian politicians
Belgian senators of the 57th legislature